Septimus Heap is a series of fantasy novels featuring a protagonist of the same name written by English author Angie Sage. In all, it features seven novels, entitled Magyk, Flyte, Physik, Queste, Syren, Darke, and Fyre. The first, (Magyk), was published in 2005 and the final, (Fyre), in 2013. A full colour supplement to the series, entitled The Magykal Papers, was published in June 2009, and an online novella titled The Darke Toad is also available. A sequel trilogy, The TodHunter Moon Series, set seven years after the events of Fyre, began in October 2014.

The series follows the adventures of Septimus Heap who, as a seventh son of a seventh son, has extraordinary magical powers. After he becomes an apprentice to the ("ExtraOrdinary") wizard of the series, Marcia Overstrand, he must study for seven years and a day until his apprenticeship ends. In the first book, he is known as Young Army Expendable Boy 412, until his great-aunt, Zelda Zanuba Heap reveals his true identity. His adventures are placed in the context of the warmth and strength of his family, and developed alongside those of Jenna, his adoptive sister, who is heir to the throne of the Castle, the community where they live. The novels, set in an elaborate fantastic world, describe the many challenges that Septimus and his friends must overcome.

The books have appeared on national bestsellers lists and received worldwide critical acclaim; Warner Bros. acquired the rights to produce a movie based on the first book. The series has been noted for the realism and richness of its characters, the compelling nature of their adventures, and its humour. It has been compared with Harry Potter and other works within the genre.

Development
Author Angie Sage has said that the character of Septimus Heap, his ultimate fate, and the world he inhabits, were fully formed in her imagination from the beginning, but she had not decided on the intermediate steps on his journey, nor on the characters he would meet. Sage described Septimus Heap's world as a place where numerous creatures and people suddenly appear and become involved in events. Commenting on the development of the Septimus Heap character, Sage has described him as someone in a strange and hostile world who has no idea of his real identity. The series gained momentum with the development of the character of Marcia Overstrand, which Sage credits as an inspiration. Septimus Heap is centred on the warmth and strength of the Heap family. In an interview Sage said:

Sage keeps a  boat (called Muriel) in real life, as does the character Sally Mullin in Magyk. Other inspirations for the series included Sage's love of history and the misty landscape of Cornwall, where she lived before starting the series. Another factor in the development of the series was her love of daydreaming: "Slowly ... lots of thinking, and daydreaming. I am a big fan of daydreaming and staring out of the window. Then keeping all my thoughts and ideas in a dog-eared old envelope for ages." With The Wilton Villager, Sage further expanded her inspiration behind the series. "It was an idea I had had for a very long time, and I waited a long time while it grew and developed. [...] I try and write the books I would have loved to have read as a child and teenager. [...] It all started with the spelling of the first title, 'Magyk.' I felt the way that magic is normally spelled makes people think of conjuring tricks and stage magicians and I wanted to avoid that, but in the past, before spelling became standardized, people would spell words how they chose to, sometimes in different ways in the same sentence. Magic was often spelled magyck, so all I did was to change that a little. After that I carried on using archaic spelling for words associated with magic and the supernatural. It makes them look a little different, gives a different flavor to them.

The series and related books

Septimus Heap Heptalogy

Magyk

The plot of the first book, entitled Magyk (published in March 2005), revolves around the pauper Heap family: Silas, Sarah and their seven children. The story begins when Silas finds Jenna in the snow. Septimus is born on the same day, but is declared dead by the midwife, who steals the baby and brings him to DomDaniel, an evil wizard. However, he is confused with the midwife's own son and is sent to the Supreme Custodian to help start a boy army. On her tenth birthday, Jenna learns from ExtraOrdinary Wizard Marcia Overstrand that she is a princess, but that she—and the Heap family—are in danger. Jenna and Nicko Heap escape to their Aunt Zelda's cottage. They are accompanied by a member of the Young Army called Boy 412, who discovers his magic powers and a legendary ring while at Zelda's. Marcia is imprisoned in DomDaniel's boat, Vengeance, and nearly dies, but is rescued by Boy 412, Jenna and Nicko after they find a flying Dragon Boat in a secret cavern by Zelda's cottage where Jenna finds a beautiful stone. At the end of the novel, Boy 412 is revealed to be Septimus, and his family hears of his past.

Flyte

The second book, Flyte (published in March 2006), begins with Septimus (now the apprentice to ExtraOrdinary Wizard Marcia Overstrand) witnessing the kidnapping of Jenna by her older brother Simon Heap. After seeking help from Nicko and a friend from the Young Army (boy 409/Wolf boy), Septimus finds Jenna at The Port, but they are followed by Simon. They fly to The Castle in the Dragon Boat, engaging in aerial combat with Simon on the way. Marcia's life is threatened by the reassembled bones of DomDaniel, but with Septimus's help, she destroys him. The novel also features the discovery of the lost Flyte charm, which gives the book its title, and the stone that Jenna gives to a Septimus turns out to be an egg that hatches into a dragon who Septimus names Spit Fyre.

Physik

The antagonist of the third book, Physik (published in March 2007), is the 500-year-old spirit of Queen Etheldredda, who is accidentally released by Silas Heap. She sends Septimus to her immortal son Marcellus Pye. He is transported back in time to become the apprentice of the young Marcellus Pye, an alchemist who teaches him about Physik. In the present timeline of the novel, the Castle is infected by a deadly plague created by rat like creature owned by Queen Etheldredda who has the plan to acquire eternal life. Jenna and Nicko meet a young trader, Snorri Snorrelssen with whom they travel in time to bring Septimus back though Nicko and Snorri couldn't escape. There, Jenna is taken to the living Queen Etheldredda as princess Esmerelda Queen Etheldredda's daughter who had disappeared, but she escapes with Septimus and they return to the present Castle. Marcia then destroys the substantial spirit of Etheldredda and Septimus brews an antidote to the plague (Sicknesse) using his knowledge of Physik. when Etheldredda is destroyed the true crown lost to Queen Etheldredda appears and is taken by Jenna for when she becomes queen.

Queste

The quest of the fourth book, Queste (published in April 2008), is a journey to the House of Foryx, in which "all times meet", to bring back Nicko and Snorri, who were trapped there after the events of the third book. Septimus is sent on this mission to Darken his Destiny for Merrin Meredith, who now holds the Two- Faced Ring by a ghost called Tertius Fume. Assisted by Jenna and his friend Beetle, among others, he pieces together a map to the House of Foryx. When they reach the house, Septimus meets Hotep-Ra, the first ExtraOrdinary Wizard, while Jenna and Beetle find Nicko and Snorri. Marcia and Sarah Heap arrive outside the house on Spit Fyre, and they return together to their own time.

Syren

The fifth book, Syren (published in September 2009), continues from where Queste ended. Septimus brings his friends to the Port, a place beside the sea where ships come and go, and when he brings back his friends back he, Jenna and Beetle get trapped on a mysterious island. There he meets a mysterious girl called Syrah Syara who tells him that she is possessed by the Syren (hence the name of the book) an evil spirit, and she also tells him about a dangerous plot by Tertius Fume to destroy The Castle. Together with the help of the others and a safe-charm jinnee sent to him by Aunt Zelda, Septimus stops the invasion of The Castle by Fume and his jinnee warriors (stolen from Milo Banda, the dead queen's husband and Jenna's father) and saves Syrah from the Syren.

Darke

The sixth book, Darke (published in America in June 2011 and England in October 2011), sees Septimus and his friends battling the Darke domain which has engulfed the Castle and everything and everyone in it. The only thing that is standing in between is Merrin Meredith who created the darke domaine and his gang of Things and Darke Dragon. Alther Mella has been accidentally Banished by Marcia when she was trying to banish Tertius Fume (who fortunately, she also banished) and Septimus wants to release him from the Darke Halls thinking he could help in undoing the Darke. When Marcia Overstrand, the ExtraOrdinary Wizard undoes the Darke spell with the help of the Paired Codes, all is well. Beetle becomes Chief Hermetic Scribe; Simon is reunited with his family after leaving his past behind and Princess Jenna is happy that the Palace and Castle are back to normal.

Fyre

Fyre (published in April 2013), sees the cast featuring the toughest challenges yet as Septimus nears the end of his ExtraOrdinary Wizard training. When the Darke wizards in the Two-Faced ring, Shamandrigger Saarn and Dramindonnor Naarn escape and Inhabit Silas Heap's brothers Ernold and Edmund they try to destroy Marcellous Pye's Alchemical Fyre but they are defeated and returned to the two faced ring which is then destroyed in the Fyre.

Spin-offs 
Septimus Heap: The Magykal Papers (published in June 2009) is a supplement to the series in a full-colour larger format with illustrations by Mark Zug. Angie Sage said in an interview that she is enjoying the process of developing this guidebook and thinking about the book's structure  and all its characters. Bloomsbury said that this Septimus Heap encyclopedia is a dazzling cornucopia of information on every aspect of Septimus's world and the creatures that inhabit it, including the secret files, the journal excerpts, charm theory, the seven basic spells, dispatches from the Message Rat Office, the history, and the maps.

The Darke Toad is an eBook novella for Amazon Kindle (published in February 2013). The novella features the return of DomDaniel as well as the Port Witch Coven, and is set between Magyk and Flyte. The eBook includes two chapters of Fyre, the final book in the series.

The TodHunter Moon trilogy starts seven years after Fyre, and revolves around Alice Todhunter Moon, the apprentice of Septimus, now ExtraOrdinary Wizard. First in the TodHunter Moon trilogy, Pathfinder (published in October 2014) picks up the world of Septimus Heap seven years after the events of Fyre, followed by SandRider (published in October 2015) and StarChaser (published in October 2016).

Film adaptation
Warner Bros. bought the rights to produce a film version of the first book, Magyk. Karen Rosenfelt would produce the film, with Sage serving as an executive producer. According to Cinematical.com, the making of the movie would not start before the final Harry Potter movie was completed. Sage said that  the screenplay would be developed after the writer's strike was over.

It was announced on 17 July 2009 that the movie would be live action, with computer animated effects, and David Frankel as director and Rob Lieber to adapt Magyk. As of 2009, a re-write of the script was being done with screenwriter Mulroney while Warner Brothers were working with a studio to create some early conceptual design/look development. Sage commented: "It is very exciting to know that others are putting their creative input into my work—quite amazing really. [...] I'm really looking forward to seeing the whole Septimus world up there on the big screen coming to life."

On the Septimus Heap official Facebook page it is stated that 'Warner Brothers decided not to proceed with it, sadly. We then had to wait 8 years to get the rights back, which we managed to do in May. So now Septimus Heap is out there again, hoping to find a TV series. But things are complicated as there are financial hangovers from the WBs contract. But I promise you, we are working really hard to get Septimus Heap onto the screen!'

Characters

The eponymous protagonist of the series is Septimus Heap. As the seventh son of a seventh son, the aptly named Septimus has exceptional magical powers. He shares his birthday with Jenna, his adoptive sister, but is presumed dead at birth by his family. For most of the first novel he appears as Boy 412, a child from the Young Army, where he has spent the first ten years of his life after DomDaniel attempted to abduct him. Thereafter he is apprentice to the ExtraOrdinary Wizard Marcia Overstrand. He has a mop of curly hair, wears green apprentice robes and has a Dragon Ring on his right hand. In the second novel, he acquires a dragon called Spit Fyre as a pet. According to a review in the Manila Standard Today, the contrast between the caution he has learned from an early age and his longing for the love and affection of a family makes him an intriguing character.

Adopted by the Heap family as a baby in place of Septimus, Jenna Heap is the daughter of the assassinated queen of the castle. She is a small girl, with deep violet eyes, dark hair (both of which all queens and princesses have had) and fair complexion; she wears a deep red cloak and the gold circlet of the princess on her head. She is portrayed as loving and caring at heart, but sometimes very stubborn. In the first novel she has a pet rock called Petroc Trelawney (presumably named after, which she loses when the Marram Marshes are flooded; she later acquires a pet duck called Ethel who becomes Sarah Heaps's pet. The ambiguity of Jenna's characterization has been questioned, with one critic commenting: "[A]s the Princess or Queenling, she comes from a turbulent past and is thrust into the anonymous world of ordinary society without any inkling of her royal background. The reader is therefore left guessing whether or not she has it in her to rise to the tenets of her position as ruler of the Castle."

Marcia Overstrand is the powerful, ambitious and wilful ExtraOrdinary Wizard of the series. She is characterized as stern, bad-tempered and intimidating, but with a good heart beneath. Her affection towards her apprentice Septimus is manifest in the novels, as is the responsibility she feels to protect him and his sister, even with her own life. She is described as a tall woman, with long, dark curly hair and deep-green eyes, and generally wears a deep purple tunic with purple python-skin boots. Her symbol and source of power, an Akhu-Amulet, which makes her ExtraOrdinary Wizard, hangs around her neck. Her haughty and vain characterization has been praised as a "well-written stand-alone".

The main antagonist of the first two novels is DomDaniel, a Necromancer and ex-ExtraOrdinary Wizard who wants to regain control of the Wizard Tower from Marcia Overstrand. The antagonist of the third novel, is Queen Etheldredda. In the fifth book the antagonists are the Syren and Tertius Fume and in the sixth book Merrin Merridith and his darke domaine. In the seventh it is the two Darke ring wizards. Several other characters appear regularly in the novels, including Septimus's parents Silas and Sarah Heap, Septimus's friend Beetle, and a trader called Snorri Snorrelssen.

Fictional setting

Like other fantasy novels, the Septimus Heap series is set in an imaginary world. Maps are provided in all of the books. Magyk contains a map of the Castle and its surroundings to the Port in the south. An enlarged map of the Castle is also included. Flyte has a map showing the Badlands and the Borderlands in the north. Physik has an enlarged map of the Castle with more details showing the Alchemie chambers. Queste has a map for the House of Foryx, drawn by Snorri for Marcellus. Syren keeps the past maps but adds the isles of Syren. The map in Syren also mentions that the country that Septimus lives in is called "The Small Wet Country Across the Sea". Darke has a map similar to that in Magyk, however, instead of including Marram Marshes which are south of the castle, it includes a map of the Darke Halls, bleak creek and the bottomless whirlpool. It also includes an enlarged map of the castle. At the end of Fyre, Septimus writes in the snow that the date is  4 July 12,004. The book ends with a quote from Arthur C. Clarke: "Any Sufficiently Advanced Technology is Indistinguishable from Magyk," hinting that the series is set in the far future. This also hinted at by a dialogue between Lucy Gringe and Wolf Boy in Syren about the Red Tube. Wolf Boy says he has heard stories that people used to travel to the moon in things like that. Lucy dismisses this; however, it is apparent they are talking about Apollo moon missions. Hints that the story is set in the future also reveal themselves when Septimus and the possessed Syrah enter a chamber that goes up and down with the press of a button, indicating that they used an elevator.

The Castle

The Castle is the main location in the series. It is situated by a river on a piece of land, circular in shape, which has been cut off from the surrounding forest by an artificial moat. The Wizard Tower, the Palace and the Ramblings are in the Castle. Sage based the structure on that of ancient walled cities which were completely self-sufficient, like little nations in their own right.

The Wizard Tower is the place where the ExtraOrdinary Wizard (Marcia Overstrand) resides along with Ordinary Wizards and their apprentices and the ExtraOrdinary Apprentice (Septimus Heap). Built by the first ExtraOrdinary Wizard, Hotep-Ra, it is a purple 21-floor tower with a gold pyramid at the top, surrounded by an aura of magyk. The Palace is the royal residence, home to Jenna, Sarah and Silas. It is much older than the Wizard Tower with secret places, such as the Queen's room, which is accessible only to the Queen or the Princess, and has a secret passage to the Marram Marshes.

Lands around the Castle

Marram Marshes
To the south of the Castle are the Marram Marshes, a long stretch of marshland near the mouth of the river, which is inhabited by many creatures, such as Brownies, Quake Oozes, Boggarts and pythons. Zelda Heap's cottage is on Draggen Island, in the middle of the marshes. It is built above the secret temple where Septimus finds the Dragon Boat. Septimus also found the egg
(which he thought was a rock) from which spit Fyre hatched in this temple. Sage has stated that the marshes are based on boggy areas at the end of a creek near her home, and that the tides and the phases of the moon in the novels are based on those for Falmouth, Cornwall.

The Forest
The Forest lies to the north-west of the Castle, and is feared by the Castle's inhabitants as a dark and dangerous area. The Wendron Witches and the witch community live there, as does Galen, Sarah Heap's mentor in Physik. The Forest has many mysterious aspects, and is dominated by shape-shifting or carnivorous trees, including Benjamin Heap, wolverines, and secrets. The Forest has a secret way to transport a character to the path leading to the House of Foryx. Sage based the Forest on medieval forests, which were huge and a law unto themselves, free from the authority of the outside world.

The House of Foryx
The House of Foryx is a magical house situated somewhere deep in another forest, surrounded by perpetual winter. It is an octagonal building flanked by four octagonal pillars. Here all times meet, and characters can go from one time to another. Characters can come into the building from any time, but can leave it in their own time only if another from that time stands outside the main door; otherwise they are lost in time, and may even end up in a time when the House of Foryx did not exist, giving them no chance of ever returning. The house is named after Foryx, a huge elephantine creature in the Septimus Heap universe.

Other locations

The Port
The Port lies in the extreme south near the sea, and is portrayed as a place full of strangers. Here ships load their cargo, which is verified by the customs officer, Alice Nettles (deceased). A dangerous coven called the Port Witch Coven can lure strangers into a trap or turn them into toads. There is a short cut from the Port to Zelda's house in the Marram Marshes. The author created the Port because of her love of the hubbub accompanying the arrival of boats. According to Sage, she sees the Port as full of "beginnings and adventures—and endings too."

The Badlands
The Badlands are a rocky and hilly valley on the northern borders of the Septimus Heap world, where Dom Daniel once practised his dark magic in an observatory atop a hill. They are inhabited by Land Wurms, giant carnivorous snakelike animals, making them a dangerous place, where Simon Heap also used to live.

Reception

The Septimus Heap novels have been published in 28 languages worldwide and have sold over one million copies in the United States, with each of the books appearing on national bestsellers lists. Published in March 2005, the first book, Magyk, became an international bestseller after it appeared at number one on the New York Times Best Sellers List.

Critical reception
The series has received mostly positive reviews.

The Independent newspaper's review of the audio books stated that the chapters are short enough to keep children of seven-plus interested but, as there are ghosts, rats, soldiers and dragon boats to help Septimus and the young Princess fight the evil necromancer DomDaniel, there is enough to keep the whole family amused.

Comparisons with other fantasy novels

Some critics have noted similarities between names in Septimus Heap and those in Harry Potter, such as Petroc Trelawney (Jenna's pet rock) and Sybill Trelawney (a professor in Harry Potter); also both series feature Boggarts (which are intelligent Marsh creatures in Septimus Heap and shape-shifters in Harry Potter). In response, British author Phil Knight has commented: The Petroc Trelawney in the Septimus Heap books is nothing at all to do with Professor Trelawney. He is a Radio 3 presenter who may well be known to Angie Sage personally, but otherwise will be known over the air. Think: why would Jenna call a pet rock 'Trelawney'? To a Radio 3 listener like me, it's perfectly logical ... And as for Boggarts, they've been around here in the North of England for a long time. Manchester has Boggart Hole Clough, for example. They're not really like either Sage's or Rowling's creatures, but pre-exist either of them.

The series has also been compared to other fantasy novels: for instance, Hotep-Ra's magical ring evokes The Lord of the Rings, and the journeys in the series are "somewhat Narnia-esque in how they play out"; similarly the concept of a remarkably powerful seventh son of a seventh son was previously employed in the Alvin Maker series of Orson Scott Card. The sprinkling of borrowed ideas has not necessarily been regarded as a negative trait: these ideas play a part in developing the flavour of the series and "don't necessarily deviate it from its originality".

References

External links
Official US website of Septimus Heap

 
2010s fantasy novels
Bloomsbury Publishing books
Novels about families
Fantasy novel series
Fantasy books by series
Novels about magic
Heptalogies
Juvenile series
Series of children's books
Katherine Tegen Books books